Alexander Innes McGregor (9 May 1838 – 17 January 1901) was a 19th-century Member of Parliament in New Zealand.

He represented the Akaroa electorate from 1887 to 1890 when he was defeated.

He was a mayor of Akaroa. His only daughter, Annie, married Thomas Penlington, the fourth son of William Penlington who also served as mayor of Akaroa.

References

Members of the New Zealand House of Representatives
1838 births
1901 deaths
Mayors of places in Canterbury, New Zealand
Independent MPs of New Zealand
New Zealand MPs for South Island electorates
Unsuccessful candidates in the 1890 New Zealand general election
19th-century New Zealand politicians
Penlington family